Thomas Harpur (5 December 1915 – 26 August 1986) was a New Zealand cricketer. He played in two first-class matches for Wellington in 1938/39.

See also
 List of Wellington representative cricketers

References

External links
 

1915 births
1986 deaths
New Zealand cricketers
Wellington cricketers
People from Hunterville